Bull Valley is a village in McHenry County, Illinois, United States. The population was 1,128 at the 2020 census. Surrounded by the suburban sprawl of Crystal Lake, Woodstock, and McHenry, the village prides itself in its rural, low-density character.

History

In 1942, a group of neighbors organized the Countryside Improvement Association. It gradually became involved in questions of land use, and in 1955, in an unprecedented action, owners of about 3,000 acres, half of the Bull Valley area at the time, voluntarily put their land into 3-acre zoning, the highest residential classification then offered by the County. This single decision would establish the future character of the community.

In 1960, money was raised from residents by subscription, to pay for a land use study and professional planning advice.  The Eastern McHenry County Plan Association (EMCPA) was then formed to address the common problems of four townships. That Association’s recommendation in a report of July 25, 1961 was that a large part of the Bull Valley area be zoned for a residential/estate use of a minimum of 5-acre tracts. Unlike the traditional concept of a community where the most intense use is at the center of the area and becomes more open as the distance from the center increases, the EMCPA area has at its center, a very attractive rolling, wooded area currently developed in low density, open estate type residential and farm development (and) included in this center portion are two very broad, scenic valleys which should be retained for non-intensive development.” When McHenry County established a Planning Commission in 1963, the EMCPA dissolved and turned its studies over to the County Planning Commission.

As the County began to consider land use policy, Bull Valley residents continued to oppose development that threatened the farms, forested hills, and wetlands. Through their association, they bore the costs of legal representation at numerous zoning hearings, until it became obvious that private efforts could not win the fight to save the rural character of the land.

In 1977, the Countryside Improvement Association was reorganized as the Bull Valley Association, which initiated and campaigned for a referendum on incorporation. The referendum passed at an election held on July 23, 1977, giving residents for the first time, the authority to implement their long-standing purposes. Because state law required that a new municipality could have no fewer than 200 voters in an area of two square miles, the Village had to reach out for scattered households, hence its peculiar shape and boundaries.

In the early years of the village, there was nearly no government infrastructure. Later, a small tax was assessed to provide for simple road repairs. By the 1980s, the village had hired a police officer part-time who shared time with the neighboring village of Prairie Grove.

The village today

Today the Village government occupies Stickney House, one of the oldest brick buildings in the area. This house was originally built without any corners due to the belief of the Stickneys that evil spirits could live in corners. While the village has grown, and even includes some subdivisions now, it remains rural, with areas of woods, farms, and low-density housing between the urban sprawl of Crystal Lake and McHenry.

Geography
Bull Valley is located at  (42.316132, -88.366815).

Major streets
  Illinois Route 120
 Greenwood Road
 Thompson Road
 Fleming Road
 Ridge Road
 Valley Hill Road
 Bull Valley Road
 Country Club Road
 Crystal Springs Road
 Crystal Lake Road
 Cold Springs Road
 Queen Anne Road
 Draper Road
 Cherry Valley Road
 Mason Hill Road

Demographics

At the 2000 census, there were 726 people, 268 households and 217 families residing in the village. The racial makeup of the village was 96.69% White, 0.55% African American, 1.10% Asian, 0.14% Pacific Islander, 0.69% from other races, and 0.83% from two or more races. Hispanic or Latino of any race were 2.20% of the population.

There were 268 households, of which 28.7% had children under the age of 18 living with them, 76.9% were married couples living together, 3.4% had a female householder with no husband present, and 19.0% were non-families. 15.3% of all households were made up of individuals, and 8.6% had someone living alone who was 65 years of age or older. The average household size was 2.71 and the average family size was 3.04.

Age distribution was 25.1% under the age of 18, 4.5% from 18 to 24, 19.3% from 25 to 44, 35.7% from 45 to 64, and 15.4% who were 65 years of age or older. The median age was 46 years. For every 100 females, there were 85.7 males. For every 100 females age 18 and over, there were 88.2 males.

The median household income was $102,693, and the median family income was $109,147. Males had a median income of $73,750 versus $37,188 for females. The per capita income for the village was $54,022. About 1.4% of families and 2.3% of the population were below the poverty line, including 3.1% of those under age 18 and 6.6% of those age 65 or over.

Notable people

 Chester Gould, cartoonist, creator of the Dick Tracy comic strip
 John H. Johnson, founder of the Johnson Publishing Company

See also
 George Stickney House
 Terwilliger House
 Barrington Hills, Illinois - A nearby village that also takes pride in its low-density, rural character.
 Wayne, Illinois - A Kane County/Dupage County village with similar demographics and a low-density, rural equestrian environment adjacent to a larger town.

References

External links

Official website

Villages in McHenry County, Illinois
Villages in Illinois
Chicago metropolitan area
Populated places established in the 1970s